Nationality words link to articles with information on the nation's poetry or literature (for instance, Irish or France).

Events

The Annus mirabilis of poetastery
In the annals of poetasting, 1877 stands out as a historic year.

 
So wrote William Topaz McGonagall (1825 –1902) a Scottish weaver, "actor", and "poet" who would become comically renowned as one of the worst poets in the English language.

Also this year Poetaster Julia A. Moore, following up on the renown of her first book of verse, The Sweet Singer of Michigan Salutes the Public of 1876, decided to appear before her public. She gave a reading and singing performance, with orchestral accompaniment, at a Grand Rapids, Michigan, opera house.

Moore managed to interpret the jeering as criticism of the orchestra.

Works published in English

United Kingdom
 William Allingham, Songs, Ballads, and Stories
 William Johnson Cory, published anonymously, Ionica II (see also Ionica 1858)
 Austin Dobson, Proverbs in Porcelain
 John Abraham Heraud, Uxmal; Macee de Leodepart
 Edward Lear, Laughable Lyrics: Fourth Book of Nonsense Poems, Songs, Botany, Music, &c., including "The Dong with a Luminous Nose", "The Courtship of the Yonghy-Bonghy-Bò", "The Pobble Who Has No Toes", "The Quangle Wangle's Hat" and "The Akond of Swat", published December 1876, although book states "1877"
 George Moore, Flowers of Passion, published this year, although book states "1878"
 William Morris, The Story of Sigurd the Volsung and the Fall of the Niblungs
 Coventry Patmore, published anonymously, The Unknown Eros, and Other Odes, odes 1–31; a second, expanded edition was published under Patmore's name in 1878

United States
 Thomas Bailey Aldrich, Flower and Thorn
 Oliver Wendell Holmes, Poetical Works
 Sidney Lanier, Poems
 James Russell Lowell, Three Memorial Poems
 Edmund Clarence Stedman, Hawthorne and Other Poems

Works published in other languages
 Giosuè Carducci, Barbarian Odes, Book 1, Italy
 Holger Drachmann, Denmark:
 Sange ved Havet ("Songs by the Sea")
 Derovre fra grænsen ("Over the Frontier there"), prose work, with interludes in verse, a series of impressions made on the poet by a visit to the scenes of the war with Germany
 Victor Hugo, France:
 L'Art d'être grand-père
 La Légende des siècles, second series (first series 1859, third series 1883)
 Stéphane Mallarmé – Poésies, France
 Rahman Baba (died 1706), Dīwān (collection), India, Pashto language, first printed version

Births

Death years link to the corresponding "[year] in poetry" article:
 January 20 – Ștefan Petică (died 1904), Romanian Symbolist poet and writer
 February 7 – Alfred Williams (died 1930), English "hammerman poet"
 March 16 – Nanalal Dalpatram Kavi (નાનાલાલ દલપતરામ કવિ), full name: Nanalal Dapatram Kavi (died 1946), Indian, Gujarati-language author and poet; son of Kavishwar Dalpatram (1820-1898)
 April 2 – Richard Rowley (died 1947), Irish poet and writer
 April 24 – Marcel Noppeney (died 1966), Luxembourg French-language poet
 May 28 – Oscar Milosz, also known as O(scar) V(ladislas) de L(ubicz-)Milosz (died 1939), Lithuanian diplomat, later a French citizen, also a fiction writer, playwright, poet and essayist; a cousin of Czeslaw Milosz, on whom he exerted a great influence
 June 6 – Ulloor S. Parameswara Iyer ഉള്ളൂര് എസ്. പരമേശ്വരയ്യര് (died 1949), Indian, Malayalam-language poet, scholar and government official, author of a five-volume history of Malayalam literature
 June 11 – Renée Vivien, born Pauline Mary Tarn (died 1909), English-born French-language Symbolist poet
 July 15 – Nina Salaman, born Paulina Ruth Davis (died 1925), English poet noted for her translations from medieval Hebrew poetry
 August 15 – Stanley Vestal (died 1957), American writer, poet and historian
 November 9 – Sir Muhammad Iqbal (aka "Allama Iqbal" [Urdu], and "Iqbal-e-Lahori" [Persian]; died 1938) Indian Muslim poet, philosopher and politician, writing in Persian and Urdu, praised as Muffakir-e-Pakistan ("The Thinker of Pakistan"), Shair-i-Mashriq ("The Poet of the East"), and Hakeem-ul-Ummat ("The Sage of Ummah"); his birthday is annually commemorated in Pakistan as "Iqbal Day", a national holiday
 November 22 – Endre Ady (died 1919), Hungarian poet

Deaths
Birth years link to the corresponding "[year] in poetry" article:
 July 14 – Richard Davies (Mynyddog) (born 1833), Welsh poet
 August 5 – Robert Williams (Trebor Mai) (born 1830), Welsh poet
 August 30 – Toru Dutt, 21 (born 1856), Indian poet, novelist and translator writing in English, of pulmonary tuberculosis

See also

 19th century in poetry
 19th century in literature
 List of years in poetry
 List of years in literature
 Victorian literature
 French literature of the 19th century
 Poetry

Notes

19th-century poetry
Poetry